Amyema fitzgeraldii, the pincushion mistletoe,  is a species of flowering plant within the genus Amyema, an epiphytic hemiparasitic plant of the family Loranthaceae endemic to Australia, and found in the Northern Territory, South Australia and Western Australia.

Description
The leaves are flat.
The inflorescence is a single group of 3-5 green and red flowers. The central flower has no bracts, unlike the surrounding flowers.  It flowers from April to October.

Ecology
A. fitzgeraldii is only found on Acacias.

Taxonomy
A. fitzgeraldii was first described by Blakely in 1922 as Loranthus fitzgeraldii, but in 1929 was placed in the genus Amyema by Danser.

References

fitzgeraldii
Eudicots of Western Australia
Flora of the Northern Territory
Flora of South Australia
Parasitic plants
Epiphytes
Taxa named by William Blakely
Plants described in 1922